White Oak Conservation, which is part of Walter Conservation, is a  conservation center in northeastern Florida. It has long been dedicated to the conservation and care of endangered and threatened species, including rhinoceros, okapi, bongo antelope, zebras, dama gazelles, and cheetahs.

White Oak partners with wildlife agencies here and abroad. In the United States, White Oak collaborates with federal and state agencies on species recovery and release efforts for Florida panthers, Florida grasshopper sparrows, Mississippi sandhill cranes and whooping cranes. In addition to native species, eighteen endangered and critically endangered species have a safe haven in spacious, natural enclosures at White Oak.

Through Walter Conservation, the Walter family conserves rare species and wild places around the world. Efforts include improving the quality of life of individual animals, recovering rare species, restoring ecosystems, and protecting wilderness areas.  Thus far, their philanthropy protects important areas in North America and Africa, protecting important wild populations of African elephants, rhinos, lions, and many other species. The Walter Conservation approach is to protect and preserve large wild areas, provide wildlife security and management, to collaborate with local residents and host-country governments, and to invest in sustainable enterprises.

White Oak is well known in the conservation and zoo communities for its rhinoceros, cheetah, and okapi (a rare giraffe relative) programs and for its support of conservation in Africa, Asia, and the United States.

History of White Oak Plantation 

The earliest recorded history of White Oak Plantation dates back to April 16, 1768, when the British governor of Florida gave land along the St. Marys River through a land grant to Andrew Way, his deputy surveyor of lands. Three years later, Jermyn Wright, also a recipient of a land grant on the St. Marys, purchased Way's property.

The plantation produced timber and was home to food stores for naval vessels using the river. After removing the stands of cypress from the property's swampy areas, Wright also began to cultivate rice, establishing the southernmost rice plantation on the Atlantic coast.

By 1833, Zephaniah Kingsley, a pre-Civil War agricultural baron, had become the plantation's owner. In 1842, White Oak Plantation was purchased by Abraham Bessent, a shopkeeper in nearby St. Marys, Georgia. The sale included extensive machinery and 118 slaves, 109 whose names were recorded on the deed.

Today, the abandoned paddies are still visible, and the remnants of a building from the Kingsley era still stand in what is now a cheetah enclosure. During the Civil War, most planters left their rice plantations and permanently relocated to their summer estates. It is probable that the plantation was abandoned at this time.

The Gilman family acquired the property in the late 1930s. Isaac Gilman grew from humble beginnings, peddling in Manhattan in the 1880s after emigrating from Europe. He saved up, and in 1907, he purchased a struggling paper company in Vermont, which was renamed the Gilman Paper Company in 1921.

Gilman handed off the business to his son, Charles, who in 1939 moved it to the  White Oak site that was acquired a year earlier and constructed a large paper operation. Early features included timber production; the breeding, raising and training of horses; and recreational programs that helped market the company, which became the largest private paper business in the country.

Charles Gilman died in 1967, leaving his sons Chris and Howard to run it as president and senior officer, respectively. Chris died in 1982, making Howard the sole owner. It was then that Howard Gilman began to spearhead additions to the White Oak property, investing $154 million to build the Baryshnikov Dance Studio, a conference center, a nine-hole golf course, and expansive enclosures and buildings to raise, breed, rehabilitate and study threatened and endangered species. (White Oak had animals, like roan antelope, before 1982, but it was that year the center officially became White Oak Conservation Center.) Outside of White Oak, Gilman also made large contributions to the Metropolitan Museum of Art and Brooklyn Academy of Music.

Starting in 1993, the Howard Gilman Foundation hosted a variety of national and international conferences and seminars at White Oak directly related to its three fields of interest: arts and culture, conservation and the environment, and public policy. The foundation—created by Gilman in 1981 to support the arts and wildlife—owned White Oak following Howard Gilman's death in 1998 until March 2013.

In March 2013, White Oak was purchased by Mark and Kimbra Walter. The Walters are conservationists who support wildlife programs across North America. White Oak operations and facilities are managed by White Oak Conservation Holdings LLC, which the Walters established for this purpose.

Animals 
White Oak has been successful in breeding, researching, and conserving a wide variety of species. Almost all of the wild population decreases of the imperiled species conserved at the center can be attributed to habitat loss, farming, and poaching.

Not to be confused with a zoo, White Oak is relatively unknown to the general public and only began offering public tours in the mid-2000s. Tours are now offered two days a week for guests who made reservations in advance.

White Oak is, however, prominent in the zoological world, providing offspring to conservation breeding programs throughout the U.S. and the world. White Oak also contributes to wildlife research and field conservation programs that have aided in the survival of several rare species. Additionally, an outreach program to educate about wildlife conservation is expected to start in 2013.

Asian Elephant 
The Asian elephant of southern and southeast Asia is endangered, threatened by the Ivory trade, habitat loss, and conflict with farmers. In 2020, White Oak Conservation gained a massive herd of some thirty-five elephants previously owned by Ringling Bros. and Barnum & Bailey Circus, and is constructing a new facility for them. In 2021, the first group of elephants arrived at the first completed part of the exhibit with more herd members expected to arrive as construction of the new habitat progresses.

Dama gazelle 
The dama gazelle — a member of the antelope family found primarily in the grasslands and woods of Africa—is one of a few critically endangered species at White Oak. The International Union for Conservation of Nature (IUCN) classifies species in one of seven categories: least concern, near threatened, vulnerable, endangered, critically endangered, extinct in the wild, and extinct.

White Oak has maintained a breeding herd of addra gazelles since 1983, and since then, more than 280 have been born at the center. White Oak participates in the Association of Zoos and Aquariums' Dama Gazelle Species Survival Plan.

Cheetah 
Classified as vulnerable, cheetahs are suffering from habitat loss and persecution from farmers protecting livestock in their homelands of Asia and northern Africa.
White Oak maintains a significant population of South African cheetahs and has collaborated in research projects to improve their care in captivity. White Oak has had 146 cubs born at its facilities.

The cheetah is the world's fastest land animal and can reach speeds over 60 miles per hour. To show off this speed, White Oak hosts "cheetah runs", which feature cheetahs chasing lures for long distances across fields. Similar types of events are hosted by other wildlife facilities, and they provide exercise and enrichment for the cheetahs while giving people the opportunity to see the cats at full speed.

Southern cassowary 
Classified as vulnerable and suffering from habitat loss and hunting, cassowaries inhabit northern Australia, Ceram, Aru Island, and New Guinea. A breeding pair lives at White Oak and has successfully raised young.

Eastern bongo 
Native to only the mountainous forests of Kenya, the eastern bongo is critically endangered, with less than 200 still in the wild. More than 130 calves have been born in 25 years to the herd at White Oak.

The center assisted in a 2004 project to deliver eastern bongos to a breeding facility at the Mount Kenya Game Ranch for study and reintroduction. Eighteen members of the species—including one born at White Oak—were gathered at the center from zoos across North America. White Oak staff journeyed with the bongo to the ranch.

Florida panther 

Overall, cougars are classified as a species of least concern, but the Florida panther subspecies is one of the world's most endangered large mammals, with less than 130 in southern Florida. This is still up from the estimated 30 to 50 in 1989.

White Oak does not have a permanent population of Florida panthers but instead works with the U.S. Fish and Wildlife Service and the Florida Fish and Wildlife Conservation Commission to prepare injured or orphaned individuals for rerelease into southern Florida. The center's spacious enclosures are meant to simulate their natural habitat, and they receive little to no human interaction to maintain their natural instincts. Instead, they are monitored by cameras and radio collars.

White Oak has rehabilitated 16 Florida panthers for release, including an orphaned brother and sister were brought to the center at 5 months old in 2011 after their mother was found dead in Collier County, Florida. After being raised, the male and female were released in early 2013 to the Rotenberger Wildlife Management Area and Collier County, respectively. Soon after being released, the female became pregnant and, a couple months later, gave birth to a single kitten. She was only 21 months old, a young age for a Florida panther to become a mother.

Gerenuk 
The gerenuk is classified as near threatened, and in its homeland of eastern Africa, there is an estimated wild population of 24,000, though this number may be underestimated.

Captive management has presented challenges because of their shy nature and unique diet. Through two decades of studying their habits, diet and biology, White Oak has learned how to manage the species.

Together with partner SEZARC (South-East Zoo Alliance for Reproduction & Conservation), the center has worked with the U.S. Department of Agriculture and the Ol Jogi Ranch in Kenya to figure out how best to import semen from wild males.

With the birth of four female calves in 2010, White Oak became the only facility in the world to produce gerenuk through artificial insemination. One of the four was later inseminated successfully by White Oak and SEZARC, creating a second generation of calves born from artificial insemination.

Giraffe 
Classified as vulnerable, the wild giraffe population totals more than 100,000. In the wild, there are nine subspecies of giraffe, differing in appearance primarily by their coats. The giraffes at White Oak are in the subspecies of reticulated giraffes.

White Oak has been home to giraffes since 1987. For his design of the center's giraffe barn, architect Anthony Moody received an architectural design award and was featured in Architecture magazine.

In October 2012, White Oak welcomed an adult male to join its female herd from partner Fossil Rim Wildlife Center in Texas. Also in 2012, two calves were born.

Greater one-horned rhinoceros 
Also known as the Indian Rhinoceros, the greater one-horned rhinoceros is classified as vulnerable, recovering from fewer than 200 in the wild to more than 2,500 (about 2,200 in India and 400 in Nepal).

This species of rhino is relatively new at White Oak, which welcomed its first calf in July 2011. Facilities like White Oak that provide large enclosures have had the most success in breeding. Another calf was born in May 2013.

Grévy's zebra 
Perhaps the least well known of the three zebra species, Grévy's zebra is endangered, with about 750 mature individuals left in its homeland in eastern Africa.

The Grévy's zebra program was one of the first established at White Oak, and since then, more than 90 foals have been born there. The center collaborates with other wildlife facilities and the Association of Zoos and Aquariums in its Grévy's zebra Species Survival Plan. Research at White Oak has included Grévy's zebra reproduction and collecting and freezing sperm. An artificial insemination program is underway in partnership with the Conservation Centers for Species Survival.

Maned wolf 

Perhaps best described as a larger version of a fox, the maned wolf is classified as near threatened, with a rough estimate of 13,000 mature individuals in the wild.

Since 1985, 50 pups have been born at White Oak, one of the few facilities that allows the mom and dad to raise the pups as they would in the wild. A 2005 Population and Habitat Viability Assessment study—which worked toward determining a more precise population status and habitat needs—was supported by White Oak.

Mississippi sandhill crane 

While sandhill cranes overall are thriving and classified as a species of least concern, the Mississippi sandhill crane subspecies is critically endangered, with a 1975 estimate of less than 35 wild individuals spurring the creation of the Mississippi Sandhill Crane National Wildlife Refuge. The refuge has the biggest release program for cranes on the planet, and 90 percent of the cranes seen there were raised in captivity.

White Oak first got involved in preservation of the species in 1994, joining the Mississippi Sandhill Crane Recovery Program and creating facilities specifically for captive breeding. Several breeding pairs have produced chicks, which are eventually transported to Mississippi for release into the refuge.

Okapi 

Okapi have haunch stripes that resemble a zebra but are related to the giraffe. They are classified as endangered, and wild populations can be found only in the Democratic Republic of the Congo.

White Oak maintains a captive breeding program and facilities for okapi. The center has imported okapi for breeding from the Okapi Conservation Project. The project was initiated in 1987 by the DRC and international partners and offers protection of an expansive area of rainforest named the Okapi Wildlife Reserve. Okapi bred at White Oak can be found in wildlife facilities across the U.S. and world.

Research at White Oak has examined the unique biology of the species, requirements for captivity, nutrition, and more.

Roan antelope 
Native to lands across Africa, the roan antelope is in the family of "horse antelopes" and can weigh up to 750 pounds. They are classified as a species of least concern and are known for strength and aggression, defending their herds and calves even against lions.

White Oak has had a large herd and breeding program since 1978. Great effort is needed to manage the species because of size, herd aggression, and health. White Oak has adapted to these needs and has maintained a thriving population, with nearly 90 calves born.

Despite the classification of least concern, populations are declining in parts of Africa. In 1996, White Oak delivered a group of young roan born at the center to parks with depleted populations for reintroduction.

Somali wild ass 

The Somali wild ass is one of two subspecies of African wild ass, the other being the Nubian wild ass. Domesticated more than 6,000 years ago in northern Africa, wild ass is thought to be the origin species for donkeys. The Somali wild ass's remaining wild population of fewer than 2,000 is found in small, scattered pockets of eastern Africa.

As part of an international effort to save Somali wild ass from extinction, White Oak received a herd in 2008, making it one of three facilities in the U.S. to breed the species. Since then, the herd has produced 18 foals, including several born in spring 2013.

Southern black rhinoceros 
The southern black rhinoceros is a subspecies of black rhinoceros. Another subspecies, the western black rhino, was declared extinct in 2011. With numbers once climbing toward 1 million, hunting and habitat destruction caused a 98 percent population decrease in black rhinos from 1960 to 1995, with a low of 2,410 in the wild in 1995.

In the late 1980s, White Oak joined the Black Rhino Foundation. The agreement included black rhinos from Zimbabwe being brought to the center in 1993 for captive breeding in case the wild population was lost. The first calf born at White Oak was taken to Africa for a breeding program and successfully produced offspring.

Wattled crane 

Classified as vulnerable, the wattled crane has a wide range in southern Africa, encompassing all of Zambia and portions of several other countries. The estimated wild population is between 6,000 and 8,000.

White Oak participates in a cooperative breeding program between the Association of Zoos and Aquariums, the Crane Species Survival Plan, and the Conservation Center for Species Survival. Collaborations are also in place with the Smithsonian Conservation Biology Institute, Fossil Rim Wildlife Center, San Diego Zoo Safari Park, and the Wilds. White Oak welcomed a new wattled crane chick in spring 2013.

Wattled curassow 
The wattled curassow is roughly equivalent to a wild turkey in size and stays in dry areas of the Amazonian forest. It is classified as endangered, with a wild population of only an estimated 350 to 1,500 scattered in Colombia, Bolivia, Peru, and Brazil. Their primary threat is hunting, with habitat loss also contributing. White Oak maintains a population of the birds.

Southern white rhinoceros 

The southern white rhinoceros is the biggest of the five rhino species, and it ranks as the third largest land animal behind the elephants. Depopulation had reduced its range to the southern tip of Africa, but reintroduction efforts have spread it farther north. It is classified as nearly threatened, with an estimated population of about 22,000 in the wild.

White rhinos are social animals and require large, open spaces, presenting a primary challenge in captive breeding. The land at White Oak has aided in overcoming this challenge, and 25 white rhinos have been born at the center.

Other features of White Oak  

While White Oak's wildlife conservation facilities are perhaps the most well-known aspect of the plantation, several other features dot the 17,000 acres.

Mikhail Baryshnikov Dance Studio 

The 6,000-square-foot facility has hosted artistic residencies and programs that have featured the American Ballet Theatre, Mark Morris Dance Group, Trey McIntyre Project, Baryshnikov Dance Foundation, and the Sundance Theatre Institute.

Its construction was a result of the White Oak Dance Project, founded in 1990 by Baryshnikov and choreographer Mark Morris. It is meant to provide a space for choreographers to create new routines and to serve as a touring arm once they are complete.

Golf course 

Opened in 1989, the course has nine holes, 54 teeing grounds, and a par of 72. Other features include a driving range and nine-hole putting course.

The 360-yard signature hole has three waterfalls circulating more than 20,000 gallons of water per minute. Clinton and Baryshnikov have been among those who have played the course. The public is able to use the course but must make reservations. Private groups and companies are also allowed to reserve the course.

Conferences and hospitality complex 

White Oak hosts meetings, conferences, and workshops of up to 100 people. Visiting organizations have included the Clinton Global Initiative, the American Zoo and Aquarium Association, National Cancer Institute, and Harvard Medical School.

Conferences are held in a multi-purpose complex that includes a conference room, fitness center, business center, bowling alley, bar, lounge, billiards, the Great Hall dining area, a formal banquet room, and the more informal Café. Nearby is the Riverside Pavilion, an outdoor, covered area along the St. Marys River that includes a stone pizza oven, a cooking center, and a pool.

References

External links 
 

Protected areas of Nassau County, Florida
Nature reserves in Florida
Nature centers in Florida
Wildlife rehabilitation and conservation centers
Dance venues in the United States
Golf clubs and courses in Florida
Buildings and structures in Nassau County, Florida
1982 establishments in Florida